There are over 20,000 Grade II* listed buildings in England. This page is a list of these buildings in the unitary authority of Cheshire West and Chester.

List

|}

Notes

See also

Grade I listed buildings in Cheshire West and Chester
Grade II* listed buildings in Cheshire
 Grade II* listed buildings in Cheshire East
 Grade II* listed buildings in Warrington
 Grade II* listed buildings in Halton (borough)

References
Citations

Sources

Notes

External links